The Kovenant is a Norwegian industrial metal band from Hamar. The band originally formed as a symphonic black metal act known as Covenant in 1993, but in 1999 were forced to change their name to The Kovenant due to a dispute with a Swedish electronic band of the same name. The band's name change also marked a change in sound/style as well, as the band from there on began to focus more on an aggrotech/industrial metal sound heavily influenced by Europe's EBM scene. Despite their style change, The Kovenant did however later reissue their early albums under The Kovenant name.

History

The "Covenant" years (1994–1999)
The band was formed as Covenant in 1993 by two black metal artists known as Nagash and Blackheart. They both met when Blackheart decided to help Nagash with his one-man project Troll. They garnered little attention after releasing a demo titled From the Storm of Shadows, but eventually a record label, Mordgrimm, took notice of them and released their first album In Times Before the Light in 1997. This album was recorded two years prior in 1995 and established them a fan base in Norway. It sounds similar to Dimmu Borgir's first opus For All Tid. Indeed, Nagash is a long-time friend to the lead vocalist of Dimmu Borgir, Shagrath.

Covenant signed with Nuclear Blast, a major German label dedicated to the hard rock scene, in 1998 and recruited four other members to form an actual band. These people were Astennu (of Dimmu Borgir, Carpe Tenebrum), Sverd (of Arcturus), Sarah Jezebel Deva (of Cradle of Filth and others), and Hellhammer (of Mayhem and others). With these new recruits, they released their second album, Nexus Polaris. The album also resulted in the band getting a Norwegian Grammy for Best Hard Rock Band and led to Nagash leaving Dimmu Borgir (for which he played bass) in order to concentrate fully on The Kovenant.

Name change and Animatronic era (1999–2002)
After the release of Nexus Polaris, Sverd, Astennu, and Sarah were fired for what Nagash has said to be "various reasons" in several interviews. Only Nagash, Blackheart, and Hellhammer remained. The band then found themselves being sued by a Swedish band of the same name. The Swedish band argued that they owned the name "Covenant" as they had been known as Covenant before Nagash and Blackheart formed their band. Consequently, they were forced to change their name to The Covenant. Unfortunately, simply adding "The" in front of the name would not suffice, because a Dutch heavy metal band had been named The Covenant since 1988. So they added "The" and also replaced the "C" with a "K" to avoid any future confusions, leading to their permanent name "The Kovenant".

In 1999, The Kovenant recorded and released Animatronic, which portrayed a stylistic change to more industrial sound. Soon the band changed their individual stage names to suit their new direction: Nagash became "Lex Icon", Blackheart became "Psy Coma", and Hellhammer became "Von Blomberg". The new album also afforded them another Norwegian Grammy and they gained a new member, Angel, while touring the USA.

After the Animatronic tour, Lex and Psy took a break and decided to re-record In Times Before the Light. But Nuclear Blast wanted nothing to do with the album, so they changed labels and released it through Hammerheart Records. A re-release of Nexus Polaris took place as well during 2002.

SETI and the wait for Aria Galactica (2002–present)
In 2002, the band found themselves back in the studio, recording SETI, their fourth album. The full-length release was preceded by a promotional EP SETI Club, and both were issued in 2003. Von Blomberg decided to do more touring and left the band to handle other projects. Two new members were recruited: Küth (of Ram-Zet) on drums and Brat (of Apoptygma Berzerk) on keyboards. They then toured Europe and the United States to promote the album.

Currently the band is working on a DVD and a new album titled Aria Galactica. Lex Icon announced recently that they have 14 pieces written so far. The album will come with a second disc consisting entirely of symphonic renditions of the tracks from the primary disc, which suggests a return to the more symphonic style exhibited by the band on their 1998 album Nexus Polaris.

The following announcement has once been seen at Lex's blog:

In an interview of August 2007, Psy Coma described Aria Galactica as "technical", with more guitar solos, "much stronger" and different from SETI. The estimated release date would be Christmas (2007). He also denied any relations between Aria Galactica and the DVD, which would be "completely megalomaniac project of making a documentary of [their] entire band history".

In 2007, the band re-released their debut album, entitled In Times before the Light 1995.

In October 2009, The Kovenant were confirmed to be performing their Nexus Polaris album with the original members at the Inferno Festival in Norway, spring of 2010. The Kovenant, along with Mayhem, Finntroll and Taake, were the first four bands to be on the Festival's bill.

In February 2010, Lex revealed on his Myspace page: "Yes, we are working on the new album again. And No, The Kovenant is not disbanded. ... Going according to schedule. Just have to get the business side out of the way. (As in what record company it will be released on etc). And we might start having open try-outs for some new blood in the very near future."

In December 2010, Lex shared "So many things will happen next year... New Troll album, Razor Runner album++, and if the universe doesn't stab us in the back; there shall be a new The Kovenant album. Cold hails from Norway!", showing that the album (and band) have not yet been abandoned.

On October 29, 2011, Nagash did a one-time only performance of their debut album at the Aurora Infernalis III festival in Arnhem, Netherlands. Except for Nagash, no other members of the current incarnation of the band participated. The band has been on hold since then.

Band members 
Current members
Stian Hinderson (Nagash/Lex Icon) −  drums (1993-1998; 2002), vocals, keyboards (1993–present), bass (1998-present)
Amund Svensson (Blackheart/Psy Coma/Pzy-Clone) − bass (1994-1998; 2002), guitar, keyboards, programming (1993−2002; 2002–present)
Audun Stengel (Angel) - guitar (2000–present)

Former members
Jan Axel Blomberg (Hellhammer/von Blomberg) - drums (1998–2003)
Jamie Stinson (Astennu) − guitar (1998−1999)
Sarah Jezebel Deva − female vocals (1998)
Eileen Küpper – female vocals (1999–2003)
Kent "Küth" Frydenlund − drums (2003−2009)
Geir Bratland (Brat) − keyboards (2003−2009)
Kharon - Bass (1994)
Steinar Sverd Johnsen - keyboards (1998)

Awards 
1998: Spellemannprisen in the category Hard rock, for the album Nexus Polaris
1999: Spellemannprisen in the category Hard rock, for the album Animatronic

Discography

Studio albums

EPs

Demos

References

External links 
The Kovenant (official) at Myspace
The Kovenant page at Nuclear Blast

Musical groups established in 1992
1992 establishments in Norway
Musical groups from Hedmark
Nuclear Blast artists
Spellemannprisen winners